The Battle of Siegburg was the first engagement of the French offensive across the River Rhine - that offensive was to become the main campaign of 1796 during the War of the First Coalition. On 30 May 1796 général de division Jean-Baptiste Kléber crossed the river at Düsseldorf with the two divisions commanded by général de division Lefebvre and général de division Colaud. He then moved on Siegburg, where he won the battle on 1 June, thus enabling general Jean-Baptiste Jourdan to bring the bulk of his force across the Rhine at Neuwied.

History

Accounts of the battle

Habsburg

French

Forces

Results

Bibliography 
 Erzherzog Carl von Österreich: Grundsätze der Strategie 2. Anton Strauss, Wien 1814 (eingeschränkte Vorschau in der Google-Buchsuche).
 Jean Baptiste Jourdan übersetzt von Johann Bachoven von Echt: Denkwürdigkeiten der Geschichte des Feldzugs von 1796. Koblenz 1823 
 Leopold Bleibtreu: Kriegsbegebenheiten bei Neuwied 1792 bis 1797. Carl Georgi, Bonn 1834, urn:nbn:de:hbz:061:1-73887.
 Peter Heinz Krause: Belagert, erobert, geplündert. Siegburger Kriegszeiten von 1583 bis 1714. Ein militärhistorischer Überblick (= Historische Studien. Band 1). Verlag Franz Schmitt, Siegburg 1998, S. 63–64.
 Daniel Schneider: Die Schlacht von Altenkirchen 1796 in ihrem historischen Kontext, in: Heimat-Jahrbuch des Kreises Altenkirchen 55 (2012), S. 183–194.

External links 
 Rickard, J (12 February 2009), Combat of Siegburg, 1 June 1796

References 

Siegburg
Siegburg
Siegburg
Siegburg
Rhein-Sieg-Kreis
Battles in North Rhine-Westphalia